The South Africa national cricket team toured New Zealand in March 1953 and played a two-match Test series against the New Zealand national cricket team. South Africa won the series 1–0 with one match drawn.

Test series summary

First Test

Second Test

References

1953 in South African cricket
1953 in New Zealand cricket
New Zealand cricket seasons from 1945–46 to 1969–70
1952-53
International cricket competitions from 1945–46 to 1960